All-Ireland championships may refer to:

All-Ireland Senior Camogie Championship
All-Ireland Senior Football Championship
All-Ireland Senior Hurling Championship
All-Ireland Senior Ladies' Football Championship
All-Ireland Under 21 Football Championship
All-Ireland Under 21 Hurling Championship
All-Ireland Minor Football Championship
All-Ireland Minor Hurling Championship
All-Ireland Senior Club Camogie Championship
All-Ireland Senior Club Football Championship
All-Ireland Senior Club Hurling Championship

Sports competitions in Ireland
Gaelic games competitions